Martiño Rivas López (born 10 January 1985), also known as  Martín Rivas, is a Spanish actor. He is best known for his performance as Marcos Novoa Pazos in the Antena 3 series The Boarding School (Spanish: El internado) and for his role in The Blind Sunflowers (Los girasoles ciegos), which earned him a nomination for the Goya Award for Best New Actor. From 2017 to 2020, he starred in the Netflix original series Las Chicas del Cable as Carlos Cifuentes.

Early life and education 
Rivas was born Martiño Rivas López on 10 January 1985 in Vimianzo, A Coruña, Galicia, Spain. He is the only son of Manuel Rivas, a writer and journalist, and María Isabel López Mariño. Rivas graduated from high school in London, and subsequently studied audiovisual communications at the University of Santiago de Compostela. He is fluent in Spanish, Galician and English. Rivas was criticized for speaking Spanish with a Galician accent.

Acting career 
Rivas began his career as a child actor in 1998 with the TVG series Mareas vivas (English: Live Tides), made in the Galician language. In 2005, he appeared in another Galician–language series, Maridos e mulleres (Husbands And Wives), also produced by TVG.

Rivas came to wider media attention in 2006, when he landed the role of Moisés in the LaSexta series SMS, opposite Yon González, Amaia Salamanca, Mario Casas, and others. From 2007 to 2010, Rivas portrayed Marcos Novoa Pazos in the Antena 3 series El internado (The Boarding School), which brought him international popularity.

In 2008, Rivas starred in José Luis Cuerda's film Los girasoles ciegos (The Blind Sunflowers) opposite Javier Cámara and Maribel Verdú, which earned him a nomination for the Goya Award for Best New Actor. The following year, he appeared in the short film Universos (Universes) along with his El internado fellow Blanca Suárez.

From 2010 to 2011, Rivas trained at the Royal Central School of Speech and Drama in London, graduating with a Masters in Classical Acting. In 2011, Rivas made his professional stage debut in Dracula, in which he portrayed Jonathan Harker. He also stars in the television series El don de Alba (Alba's Gift) on Telecinco.

He has a major, continuing role in Las Chicas del Cable as Carlos Cifuentes; its first season premiered on Netflix in April 2017. Its fifth season is to premier in 2020.

Other work 
In 2007, along with Yon González and Marta Torné, Rivas supported the ONG Childhood Without Limits Foundation.

In 2010, Rivas became ambassador for Spanish fashion designer Purificación García. He made his first campaign for the 2010 Spring/Summer collection with Ángela Molina. The same year, he also posed for the famous calendar Larios de la Moda.

Filmography

Stage credits

Awards and nominations

References

External links 
 

1985 births
Male actors from Galicia (Spain)
Living people
People from A Coruña (comarca)
Spanish male child actors
Spanish male film actors
Spanish male models
Spanish male stage actors
Spanish male television actors
21st-century Spanish male actors